A frenuloplasty of tongue is a frenuloplasty of the frenulum of tongue.

A tight frenulum in this context is sometimes referred to as "tongue-tie" which is also known as ankyloglossia.  In this condition the frenulum of the tongue restricts range of motion which may interfere with breastfeeding or speech.   A less extensive clipping of the lingual frenulum is known as a frenotomy.

See also
 Frenectomy

References

 Tongue Tie South Florida

Tongue surgery